Wesley Irvine (December 1866 – June 6, 1945) was a member of the Wisconsin State Assembly.

Biography
Irvine was born in the Province of Canada in December 1866. He graduated from the University of Maryland School of Medicine in 1892.

He died in Madison on June 6, 1945.

Career
Irvine was elected to the Assembly in 1906 and 1908. He was a Republican.

References

People from Waupaca County, Wisconsin
Republican Party members of the Wisconsin State Assembly
Physicians from Wisconsin
University of Maryland School of Medicine alumni
1866 births
1945 deaths